Harnessed the Storm is the second studio album by American electronic music duo Drexciya. It was released on Tresor in 2002. Designed as the first of seven conceptually linked albums that the duo produced over the course of a single year, it is the only one credited to Drexciya. Different aliases were used for the others.

Critical reception

Philip Downey of Exclaim! described Harnessed the Storm as "forward-looking, vocal-less, sci-fi stuff". Andy Battaglia of The A.V. Club felt that Drexciya "still creates some of the most visionary electro around", but concluded that the album's "Detroit-style formalism" sounds "too old-fashioned to sneak the future into the past".

In 2010, Resident Advisor placed Harnessed the Storm at number 97 on its list of the "Top 100 Albums of the 2000s". In 2017, Pitchfork placed it at number 11 on its list of "The 50 Best IDM Albums of All Time".

Track listing

References

External links
 

2002 albums
Drexciya albums